The Croatia men's national 3x3 team is the 3x3 basketball team representing Croatia in international men's competitions.

In 2018, the team competed in the men's 3x3 basketball tournament at the 2018 Mediterranean Games held in Tarragona, Spain. The team was eliminated in the quarter-finals by eventual gold medalist France.

The team competed at the 2021 FIBA 3x3 Olympic Qualifying Tournament hoping to qualify for the 2020 Summer Olympics in Tokyo, Japan.

References

Croatia men's national basketball team
Men's national 3x3 basketball teams